Catherine "Casty" Cobb (née Cockerell; 28 March 1903 – 17 September 1995) was a British jeweller and silversmith, she was from an established Art and Crafts family.

Biography
Cobb was the daughter of bookbinder Douglas Cockerell; her uncle Sydney was director of the Fitzwilliam Museum in Cambridge and knew both William Morris and John Ruskin. Her mother Florence Arundel was a jewelry maker who inspired her to work with metal. Nicknamed "Casty" by her classmates at the Central School, Cobb learned jewelry and silversmithing during the 1920s. She became friends with Joyce Clissold, a textile printer, and later took over a space in the Footprints textile workshop which Clissold took over from its founders.

In 1937, she married Arthur Cobb. She had one son and three daughters. Her legacy as a jeweller continues in her granddaughter Abi Cochran  who is also a jeweller having started to learn at her grandmothers knee

The Cobbs moved to Cambridge during the Second World War where she taught drawing and design and well as jewelry at Cambridge Technical College. She continued to teach jewelry at her house in Trumpington up until just a few months before her death aged 92, sharing the benefits of her excellent collection of tools and her enthusiasm for the subject. When her children had grown up she began examining in art for the University of Cambridge Local Examination Syndicate, often travelling with the potter Charlotte Bawden. She was sent to Malaya, Africa and India.

Career

Jewelry and silversmithing 
Cobb began taking on orders for individuals and worked at Cameo Corner, a jewellery shop near the British Museum.

Her work falls into three categories:  First, jewelry, often using found objects like garnets from a Scottish stream and materials of low value (for example safety pins).  Second, she also supplied silver clasps and other ornaments for bookbindings for the Cockerell Bindery which was carried on by her sibling Sydney. Third, her most individual contribution was her silver pique work on ivory and ebony. This consists of hammering silver wire into holes pierced in the base material to make tiny silver spots arranged in simple patterns.  She made boxes and cruet sets, but particularly cutlery.  After WW1 she realised the likely demand for fine stainless steel table knives since the servants to polish the previously used  silver knives no longer existed.  She made knives and forks with steel elements forged in Sheffield to her design, to which she added her distinctive pique handles.

Cobb was a member of the Art Workers Guild.

Puppetry
In the late 1920s and early 1930s Cobb became interested in puppetry.  She found some Punch and Judy puppets in the family attic and Clissold printed fabric for a "set-up" and in the summer of the 1930s they took their Punch and Judy show on tour around Buckinghamshire and along the south coast.  Around the same time she began to assist sculptor William Simmonda. She worked in his woodcarving workshop in the Cotswolds, and behind the scenes of his critically acclaimed puppet shows which were performed in front of the Duke of Westminster and Winston Churchill.

Legacy 
Cobb's work is in the collections of:
 Crafts Study Centre at Farnham, Surrey
 Worshipful Company of Goldsmiths

Exhibitions 
 Women's Work  (2019) Ditchling Museum of Art + Craft, Sussex

References 

1903 births
1995 deaths
People from Cambridge
English silversmiths
British jewellers
Women jewellers